Pittsburgh Regional Transit (PRT, formerly Port Authority of Allegheny County) is the second-largest public transit agency in Pennsylvania and the 20th-largest in the United States. The state-funded agency is based in Pittsburgh and is overseen by a CEO and a nine-member board of unpaid volunteer directors, five of whom are appointed by the county executive and approved by the county council; and one each by the majority and minority leaders by each political party. After operating as the Port Authority of Allegheny County for most of its history, the agency rebranded under its current name in June 2022.

Pittsburgh Regional Transit's bus, light rail and funicular system covers Allegheny County. On some longer-distance routes, service extends into neighboring counties such as Beaver, Washington, and Westmoreland. These counties have their own transit systems, including several routes that run into downtown Pittsburgh, where riders can make connections with PRT service.

History
Pittsburgh Regional Transit was created as the Port Authority of Allegheny County by the Pennsylvania General Assembly in 1956 to allow for creation of port facilities in the Pittsburgh area. Three years later, the legislation was amended to allow the Port Authority to acquire privately owned transit companies that served the area. This included the Pittsburgh Railways Company and 32 independent bus and incline operations.

On April 19, 1963, the Board of Allegheny County Commissioners authorized the acquisition of 32 transit companies, including the Pittsburgh Railways Company, which had provided bus and streetcar service to Pittsburgh since January 1902, and an incline plane company, for about $12 million. On March 1, 1964, Port Authority Transit began service.

Shortly after the Port Authority began service, 150 GM "Fishbowl" buses were introduced to replace aging ones acquired from its predecessors, a new route numbering convention was introduced, and the fare system was streamlined. Due to urban sprawl, the  agency introduced new routes that served new communities. In the following years, additional buses were ordered and several new transit garages opened. Many of the trolley lines acquired from Pittsburgh Railways were abandoned, and turned into bus lines; South Hills lines via Beechview and Overbrook were retained. In the late 1960s and early 1970s, the Port Authority hoped to introduce a modern rapid transit system known as Skybus with rubber-tired vehicles running on rails, but the plan fell through.

In the early 1970s, the Port Authority entered what was dubbed by its fans the "Mod" era, with buses repainted in splashy paint schemes. Several new flyer routes and routes to Oakland's university core were introduced as part of a new general marketing strategy. In 1975 the Port Authority took over the Baltimore and Ohio Railroad commuter rail line to Versailles, which it branded PATrain. These new routes, coupled with the 1973 oil crisis, generated a major increase in ridership. Due to the poor state of the economy at the time, fares increased and there was a brief strike in 1976. In spite of these setbacks, the South Busway opened in 1977 and plans for other capital investments were made.

During the 1980s, with gas prices falling and population loss from the decline of the steel industry, ridership decreased and the agency lowered fares to attract new riders in the middle of the decade. Many new buses were ordered, and the Martin Luther King Jr. East Busway opened in 1983. Part of the line was an updated version of the old trolley system. In July 1985, the downtown subway opened, the Beechview line followed in 1987 and the Library line a year later. In 1989, the agency celebrated its twenty-fifth year of existence, and commuter rail to Versailles was discontinued.

The agency was rocked by a four-week strike due to a labor dispute in 1992. The strike, coupled with changing demographic patterns, caused a decrease in ridership. New buses that were compliant with the Americans with Disabilities Act of 1990 were introduced early in the decade. In 1993, the badly deteriorated Overbrook light rail line was shut down, requiring trains to use the Beechview line. Several capital projects, such as the construction of a western busway and light rail extensions were considered. In 1998, the agency rebranded itself as "Ride Gold" with new paint schemes and a new marketing campaign.

In 2000, the West Busway from the Ohio River to Carnegie was opened. Shortly thereafter, new bus routes to outlying communities such as Cranberry were established. In 2003, a short extension of the East Busway was completed. The following year, the Overbrook light rail line was re-opened after a lengthy reconstruction. Construction also started on a light rail extension to Pittsburgh's North Shore near Heinz Field, known as the North Shore Connector. Unfortunately, in spite of the capital projects expansion, the agency was in serious financial trouble by the middle of the decade. In June 2007, the agency went through with a 15 percent service cut in order to cut the deficit. In order to provide a dedicated source of funding, Allegheny County Chief Executive Dan Onorato introduced the controversial 10% Allegheny County Alcoholic Beverage Tax in 2008 to fund the agency. Later that same year, another strike was narrowly averted. The agency is planning a major service overhaul that will begin to go into effect in March 2010.

Pittsburgh Regional Transit pays $168,763 annually to Buchanan, Ingersoll & Rooney and $48,750 annually to Greenlee Partners to lobby the Pennsylvania General Assembly.

Funding crisis of 2010–12
Between 2007 and 2010, Pittsburgh Regional Transit cut its annual expenses by $52 million and raised its revenues by $14 million to help alleviate a statewide transportation funding crisis. The funding crisis only grew worse, however. The state legislature assumed it would receive permission to convert Interstate 80 into a toll road to increase revenues, but the federal government denied the request, leading to a gap in the state transportation budget of $472 million.

On November 24, 2010, Pittsburgh Regional Transit's board of directors approved a massive service cut and fare hike to go into effect in March 2011, reducing service hours by approximately 35 percent, including the elimination of 45 routes. Pittsburgh Regional Transit's budget from the state was to be substantially reduced for 2011, and as chairperson Joan Ellenbogen noted, the PRT is legally required to adopt a balanced budget. Chairperson Guy Mattola stated that "Unfortunately, we are now at the point that all options have been exhausted...It is necessary to move forward with this service reduction plan recognizing the devastating consequences for riders and non-riders alike."

On December 13, 2010, the Southwestern Pennsylvania Commission approved a plan by governor Ed Rendell to allocate $45 million in temporary funding for Pittsburgh Regional Transit to help reduce the magnitude of these service cuts. Many details of the emergency funding, including how long Pittsburgh Regional Transit must make the $45 million last and exactly how many routes slated to be cut could be saved, were not settled by the end of 2010.

On March 27, 2011, a 15 percent service reduction went into force.  Twenty nine routes were removed, thirty seven reduced, and a bus maintenance facility shut down.

On September 2, 2012, a 35% reduction is scheduled; fares rose on July 1 to $2.50 in Zone 1.

In November 2013, the Pennsylvania legislature approved a long-awaited and hotly debated transportation bill, now known as Act 89. Act 89 provided dedicated funding to Pittsburgh Regional Transit, putting the agency on more solid financial footing. One of the routes cut in 2011, the 55 Glassport, was restored in 2013.

The Pittsburgh Regional Transit brand

Although Pittsburgh Regional Transit is part of the local fans' folklore, its off-beat imaging is more notorious. Throughout the 1960s and early 1970s the bus fleet was very recognizable with its fleet of air-conditioned GM "Fishbowls" (from their 1964, 1965, 1966, 1967 and 1971 orders) sporting a white top with small red strip. Other noticeable features included side destination signs placed near the exit door and an unusual seating arrangement with one side facing forward and the other lining up to match the seating placed on the wheel well. PAT would continue ordering buses in that specification until 1995 when they ordered buses with both seating sides facing front except when on wheel wells. The side destination signs were moved immediately to the left of the front door starting with the 1998 Neoplan AN-460 (articulated bus) order. This continued with the Neoplan Metroliner order but skipped the Neoplan AN-440LF order in 1999. The 2003 order of Gillig Advantage low-floors and all subsequent orders have conformed with the side sign next to front door configuration. It is worth noting that the 1980 GM's RTS buses acquired were specified with the current side sign configuration.

By 1972 it entered what was dubbed by fans the "Mod" era, as buses were given flashy new paint schemes. Buses were painted with color at the front and rear, slanted to line up with the windows, and a large white portion in between.

In the 1980s, the classic 1960s white and red strip look was updated with a larger red strip accompanied by a black strip painted around the window area, while a white background covered most of the bus exterior. This color scheme was in existence for roughly 20 years on the Flxible and NovaBus 'classics' series, although these buses were later repainted and refurbished into the uniform color livery up until their retirements.

In 1998, PRT rebranded itself as "Ride Gold" to coincide with its 35th anniversary.

In the early 2000s, Pittsburgh Regional Transit buses included various transportation-related words and phrases repeated across the exterior, such as the words "move", "go" "ride" or "connect", combinations of "rockin'" and "rollin'", "ziggin'" and "zaggin'", or "here" and "there".

On September 21, 2006, the then-Port Authority announced that it was retiring the "Ride Gold" campaign and that the bus and light rail fleet will follow the standard design and uniform colors of its Gillig bus fleet. The reason was the system's decision to return to a back-to-basics approach and to save costs on wholesale repainting and refurbishing. Their website began to use simple "PORT AUTHORITY" fonts, and some buses and light rail vehicles have been repainted with the standard "Port Authority" font.

On June 9, 2022, at Gateway Station, it was announced that the Port Authority of Allegheny County was rebranding due to their name being a misnomer. It was said that the new name better represented who they are and how they were viewed.

Fare structure
On April 29, 2016, following several months of public hearings, Pittsburgh Regional Transit's board of directors voted unanimously to implement sweeping changes to the fare system in 2017, including a decrease in fares for some riders for the first time in over 35 years. The new fare system eliminated the current zone-based fare collection in favor of a flat $2.50 single-ride fare for all riders who pay via ConnectCard, and $2.75 for those who pay with cash. The first transfer to another line made within three hours costs $1.00. Beginning January 1, 2022, ConnectCard users paid $2.75 single-fare ride with a three-hour free transfer period. Cash users still pay $2.75 per ride.

Riders between Zones 1 and 2 used to pay a single-ride fare of $3.75, one of the highest intra-urban fares in the country. Although doing so was estimated to lose $4 million in revenue for the agency, the 25-cent cash surcharge aims to recoup at least some of the losses, along with eliminating paper transfer tickets for cash fares and establishing a $2 surcharge for new or replacement ConnectCard purchases. These changes are also intended to discourage paying fares with cash in favor of increased ConnectCard use, which the agency also says will speed up trip times. Seniors 65 years and older and up to three children below 6 ride for free with a fare-paying rider; disabled and Medicare users, as well as children ages 6 to 11, pay either $1.35 in cash or $1.25 with ConnectCard, and $0.50 for transfers.

The agency also voted to abolish the "pay enter/pay leave" fare collection policy in favor of all riders simply paying their fare upon entering the bus regardless of destination, similar to the method used on most other American transit agencies.  This change eliminated the free fare zone in downtown Pittsburgh, excluding rides on the "T" between Downtown and the North Shore which remain accessible for no charge. The agency also eventually plans to implement a proof of payment system, with riders required to scan their ConnectCards at kiosks on station platforms prior to boarding and Pittsburgh Regional Transit fare officers performing random inspections on board to ensure payment.

Previous fare system

Pittsburgh Regional Transit used a fare structure based on four main zones (1, 1A, and 2). The downtown area was an unnumbered Free Fare Zone,  established in 1985 to encourage transit use in downtown and reduce stop "dwell" times (the amount of time a transit vehicle must remain stopped for passengers to board or alight).  All rides within the downtown zone are free, at all times on the light rail system (called the "T") and until 7 p.m. on buses, seven days a week.  Originally the free-fare zone applied only until 7 p.m. on both buses and light rail, but it was expanded to 24 hours on the latter in 1989. Zone 1 was the zone closest to downtown Pittsburgh, and Zone 2 comprised the outer half of Allegheny County and all stops outside of Allegheny County. A few routes cross briefly into neighboring counties.

The system used an "outbound" pay system for daytime transit to and from downtown. Fare was paid when boarding on the "outbound" part of the route. This applies only on buses that serve downtown; on most that do not serve downtown, the rider pays upon entry. During the evening, on buses serving downtown, the method changes on many routes to "pay when boarding" (also known as "pay enter"), due to the possibility of riders trying to avoid paying the fare. In combination with the downtown Free Fare Zone, this fare collection system permits boarding to take place via all doors in downtown (except evenings), greatly reducing loading delays in the part of the system with the heaviest concentration of transit routes and passenger boarding per stop.

Pittsburgh Regional Transit sells non-discounted single-use tickets, and discounted weekly, monthly and annual passes. Each carries a small discount over earlier time-based passes and is valid for an unlimited number of trips/transfers in the specified zone(s) for that time period. For example, for a zone 1 pass the cost of a weekly is the equivalent of 9.5 one-way trips, a monthly is equivalent to 34 trips, and an annual is equivalent to 377 trips. An annual pass is a 12-month subscription to monthly passes, which can be either mailed or picked up at the Downtown Service Center on Smithfield Street.

Students and staff of several colleges in the area, most notably Carnegie Mellon University and the University of Pittsburgh, ride the bus at a discounted yearly rate: students pay a fee each semester to the PRT.

Pittsburgh Regional Transit installed new fareboxes on all buses in 2011, and has converted to a smart card fare collection system marketed as the "ConnectCard" starting in early 2012. The University of Pittsburgh and Carnegie Mellon University use the new farebox system by equipping their ID cards with a chip the farebox can scan and recognize. Because individuals affiliated with the Universities ride for "free," the system serves only to authenticate the validity of the ID card, and no fares are calculated or assessed.

Light rail

Pittsburgh Regional Transit operates a  light rail system called the "T" from downtown subway stations to neighborhoods and suburbs south of the city on surface tracks with right-of-way.

The system comprises three lines:
Red Line
Blue Line
Silver Line

Funiculars

Pittsburgh's mass transit system also includes two unique funiculars (called "inclines" locally) from the top of Mt. Washington to its base along the Monongahela River, just across from Downtown Pittsburgh.

Both the Duquesne Incline and the Monongahela Incline have stations along Grandview Avenue atop Mt Washington and in the Station Square area at the base.

The Duquesne Incline is owned by Pittsburgh Regional Transit, and The Society for the Preservation of the Duquesne Heights Incline operates it as a non-profit organization. It has the original cars and the original stations.

Buses

Pittsburgh Regional Transit operates 700 buses, as of April 2014, in Allegheny County, and also service extends slightly into neighboring Beaver, Butler, Washington and Westmoreland counties. Some bus routes operate seven days a week between 4:00 am and 2:00 am, but many routes have more restricted hours, or do not operate on weekends, or on Sundays and holidays.

In May 2001 the fleet installed its first bike racks, with 75 buses installing 2 bike racks on 8 routes on May 17, 2001. In September 2011, the last remaining buses received bike racks.

Bus rapid transit

In December 1977 Port Authority unveiled its first dedicated busway, the 4.3-mile South Busway, which combined bus and light rail routes into an efficient and quicker connection between downtown Pittsburgh and the South Hills area. The Martin Luther King Jr. East Busway, which used express routes to connect downtown with nearby east side communities like Swissvale, Wilkinsburg and Homewood followed in February 1983. On Sunday, September 10, 2000, Port Authority opened its West Busway, which provides service from downtown Pittsburgh to Carnegie. In 2003, the East Busway was expanded by a few miles to Swissvale and Rankin.

On July 22, 2011, the Port Authority  approved spending at least $1 million, including $837,993 in federal funding and $209,498 in county money, to study developing a rapid bus line line from Downtown to the Oakland section. The study should take up to 18 months to be completed and will use no money from Pittsburgh Regional Transit's operating budget.

Bus fleet
All of PRT's bus fleet (except for buses individually contracted) as of 2019 is low floor.

Active PRT Fleet

Contracted Fleet

Other services
Pittsburgh Regional Transit operates more than 60 park-and-ride lots in Allegheny County. It owns 66 transit bridges, 11 highway bridges and four tunnels.

Under the PRT-sponsored ACCESS program, a private contractor provides door-to-door service to elderly and disabled passengers throughout the county, seven days a week from 6 a.m. to midnight.  Reservations are placed one day in advance.  The ACCESS program is noted as one of the first, most innovative and best in the nation.

Between 2001 and 2004 the Port Authority worked with the local community group Ground Zero to create and operate the "Ultra Violet Loop"; known to some as the "party bus", the UV Loop bus was special service operated on Friday and Saturday nights through the early morning, serving city nightlife and university centers. The UV Loop bus was part of special evaluative service supported in part by local foundations and businesses.  While it was well regarded in the abstract, it never achieved the ridership and consistent service needed to continue without external support.  The "Ultra Violet Loop" name is a play on the Pittsburgh/Allegheny County Belt System.

Future

Potential capital expansions

Several capital expansions have been proposed from various sources. The construction of a light rail line from Oakland to Pittsburgh International Airport has been proposed by County Executive Dan Onorato and former Congressman Mike Doyle, projected to cost about $3.5 billion. Doyle has recently submitted a request to the Federal government to study the feasibility of the project. Studies for a commuter rail line from downtown to Arnold along the right-of-way of the Allegheny Valley Railroad and from downtown to Greensburg along the right-of-way of Norfolk Southern railroad are also underway. According to the feasibility study, it is unclear whether Pittsburgh Regional Transit, the Westmoreland County Transit Authority, or an as-yet created independent agency would operate the railway.

Current finances
Since 2007, Pittsburgh Regional Transit cut annual expenses by $52 million and raised revenues by $14 million to help alleviate a $472 million gap in the state transportation budget. In late 2010, the PRT's board approved service cuts of 35% (45 routes) and fare increases. The Southwestern Pennsylvania Commission approved a plan by Governor Ed Rendell to allocate $45 million for the Authority to help reduce service cuts to only 15% on March 27, 2011. Since Governor Tom Corbett's 2012 budget, Pittsburgh Regional Transit has renewed plans to cut service by 35% if the state fails to help with a projected $64 million budget deficit.

See also
Port Authority Police Department
List of rapid transit systems
Paul Skoutelas
Dennis Veraldi
SEPTA

References

External links

 

Pittsburgh Transit History Site

 
Intermodal transportation authorities in Pennsylvania
Bus transportation in Pennsylvania
Transportation in Pittsburgh
Government agencies established in 1964
Transit authorities with natural gas buses
Municipal authorities in Pennsylvania
Transportation in Allegheny County, Pennsylvania
Government of Allegheny County, Pennsylvania
1964 establishments in Pennsylvania